In mechanism design, monotonicity is a property of a social choice function. It is a necessary condition for being able to implement the function using a strategyproof mechanism. Its verbal description is:

In other words:

Notation 
There is a set  of possible outcomes.

There are  agents which have different valuations for each outcome. The valuation of agent  is represented as a function:

which expresses the value it assigns to each alternative.

So .

A social choice function is a function that takes as input the value-vector  and returns an outcome .

In mechanisms without money 

A social choice function satisfies the strong monotonicity property (SMON) if for every agent  and every , if:

then:
 (by the initial preferences, the agent prefers the initial outcome).
 (by the final preferences, the agent prefers the final outcome).
equivalently:

Necessity 
If there exists a strategyproof mechanism without money, with an outcome function , then this function must be SMON.

PROOF: Fix some agent  and some valuation vector . Strategyproofness means that an agent with real valuation  weakly prefers to declare  than to lie and declare ; hence:

Similarly, an agent with real valuation  weakly prefers to declare  than to lie and declare ; hence:

In mechanisms with money 
When the mechanism is allowed to use money, the SMON property is no longer necessary for implementability, since the mechanism can switch to an alternative which is less preferable for an agent and compensate that agent with money.

A social choice function satisfies the weak monotonicity property (WMON) if for every agent  and every , if:

then:

Necessity 
If there exists a strategyproof mechanism with an outcome function , then this function must be WMON.

PROOF: Fix some agent  and some valuation vector . Strategyproofness means that a player with valuation  weakly prefers to declare  over declaring ; hence:

Similarly, a player with valuation  weakly prefers to declare  over declaring ; hence:

Subtracting the second inequality from the first gives the WMON property.

Sufficiency 
Monotonicity is not always a sufficient condition for implementability, but there are some important cases in it is sufficient (i.e, every WMON social-choice function can be implemented):
 When the agents have single-parameter utility functions.
 In any convex domain (Saks and Yu (2005)).
 In any domain with a convex closure.
 In any "monotonicity domain".

Examples 
1. When agents have single peaked preferences, the median social-choice function (selecting the median among the outcomes that are best for the agents) is strongly monotonic. Indeed, the mechanism selecting the median vote is a truthful mechanism without money. See median voter theorem.

2. When agents have general preferences represented by cardinal utility functions. the utilitarian social-choice function (selecting the outcome that maximizes the sum of the agents' valuations) is not strongly-monotonic but it is weakly monotonic. Indeed, it can be implemented by the VCG mechanism, which is a truthful mechanism with money.

3. The weak-monotonicity property has a special form when agents have single-parametric utility functions.

4. In the job-scheduling, The makespan-minimization social-choice function is not strongly-monotonic nor weakly-monotonic. Indeed, it cannot be implemented by a truthful mechanism; see truthful job scheduling.

See also 
 The monotonicity criterion in voting systems.
Maskin monotonicity
 Other meanings of monotonicity in different fields.

References 

Mechanism design